Juan Leovigildo Brouwer Mezquida (born March 1, 1939) is a Cuban composer, conductor, and classical guitarist. He is a Member of Honour of the International Music Council.

Family
He is the grandson of Cuban composer Ernestina Lecuona y Casado. His great-uncle, Ernesto Lecuona, composed "La Malagueña" and his second cousin, Margarita Lecuona, composed "Babalú", which was popularized by Cuban musician and actor Desi Arnaz.

Music career

Early years
Brouwer was born in Havana. When he was 13, he began classical guitar with the encouragement of his father, who was an amateur guitarist. His teacher was Isaac Nicola, who was a student of Emilio Pujol, who was himself a student of Francisco Tárrega. At age 17 he performed publicly for the first time and began composing.

Brouwer went to the United States to study music at the Hartt College of Music of the University of Hartford, and later at the Juilliard School, where he studied under Vincent Persichetti and took composition classes with Stefan Wolpe.

In 1970 Brouwer played in the premiere of El Cimarrón by Hans Werner Henze in Berlin. Together with Morton Feldman, he was awarded a 1972 scholarship by the DAAD (German Academic Exchange Service) and to work as a guest composer and lecturer at the Academy of Science and Arts of Berlin. In Germany Brouwer also recorded a number of LPs for Deutsche Grammophon.

Composing and performing
In his early compositions, Brouwer remained close to the rhythms of Cuban music, while later he was drawn to aleatoric music. During the 1960s and 70s, he became interested in the music of modernist composers such as Luigi Nono and Iannis Xenakis, using indeterminacy in works such as Sonograma I. Other works from this period include the guitar pieces Canticum (1968), La espiral eterna (1971), Parábola (1973) and Tarantos (1974). More recently, Brouwer's works have leaned towards tonality and modality. The solo guitar works El Decamerón Negro (1981), Paisaje cubano con campanas (1986), and the Sonata (1990; for Julian Bream) exemplify this tendency. His playing career ended in the early 1980s due to an injury to a tendon in his right hand middle finger.

Brouwer has written for guitar, piano, and percussion, and has composed orchestral works, ballet, and music for over one hundred movies, including the film Like Water for Chocolate. For a guitar competition in Hungary in 1979, he wrote a composition that employed 200 guitarists. He is known for a series of  studies called the Etudes Simples. Brouwer has also transcribed Beatles songs for classical guitar.

He has performed and recorded works by Sylvano Bussotti, Hans Werner Henze, Maurice Ohana, Cristóbal Halffter, Leni Alexander, Cornelius Cardew, and Heitor Villa-Lobos.

Other activities
He has been a conductor for many symphony orchestras, including the BBC Concert Orchestra, the Berlin Philharmonic, and the Cordoba Symphony in Spain.

Brouwer is involved in the Concurso y Festival Internacional de Guitarra de la Habana (Havana International Guitar Festival and Competition). He frequently travels to attend guitar festivals throughout the world, and especially to other Latin American countries.

Brouwer, according to the composer himself, has never been a member of the Communist Party of Cuba, but has nevertheless held a number of official posts in Cuba, including with the music department of the Cuban Institute of Cinematographic Art and Industry.

Brouwer is the great-uncle of Al Jourgensen of Ministry fame. Brouwer is the brother of Jourgensen's maternal grandfather.

Selected compositions

Chamber and solo instrumental
 2009 Mitología de las Aguas (Sonata No. 1 for flute and guitar)

Film scores
 1968: Lucía
 1992: Like Water for Chocolate (film)

References

Other sources
Andy Daly, Leo Brouwer. Music Web International, accessed June 9, 2011

Further reading
Articles
 Hablar con Leo 
 "Let Us Play for Our Children" Guitar magazine
 Hombre que juega Pedro de la Hoz, 2004 (Granma) 
 El Decameron Negro by Arnaud Dumond 

Interviews
 1 2 Entretiens avec Leo Brouwer by Arnaud Dumond, Françoise-Emmanuelle Denis 
 An Interview With Leo Brouwer by Constance McKenna, 1988 
 Leo Brouwer Artist Profile/Interview Classical Guitar Alive! (audio recording recovered from the Internet Archive)

Documentaries
 Leo Brouwer–Irakere (1978), written and directed by Jose Padron
 Leo Brouwer (2000), written and directed by Jose Padron

1939 births
20th-century classical composers
20th-century guitarists
20th-century male musicians
21st-century classical composers
21st-century guitarists
21st-century male musicians
Composers for the classical guitar
Cuban classical composers
Cuban classical guitarists
Cuban film score composers
Deutsche Grammophon artists
Juilliard School alumni
Latin Grammy Award winners
Latin music composers
Living people
Male classical composers
Male film score composers
Cuban male guitarists
People from Havana
Pupils of Vincent Persichetti
University of Hartford Hartt School alumni
Zoho Music artists